Valeyta Roi Althouse (born January 7, 1974) is an American former athlete. She competed in the women's shot put at the 1996 Summer Olympics.

References

External links
 

1974 births
Living people
Athletes (track and field) at the 1996 Summer Olympics
American female shot putters
Olympic track and field athletes of the United States
21st-century American women